Chandra Bimbam is a 1980 Indian Malayalam language film,  directed by N. Sankaran Nair. The film stars Jayabharathi, Prathap Pothen, Sathar and M. G. Soman. The film has musical score by Shankar–Ganesh.

Cast
Jayabharathi
Prathap Pothen
Sathar
M. G. Soman

Soundtrack
The music was composed by Shankar–Ganesh and the lyrics were written by Ravi Vilangan.

References

External links
 

1980 films
1980s Malayalam-language films
Films scored by Shankar–Ganesh
Films directed by N. Sankaran Nair